The Philadelphia Atoms were an American professional soccer team based out of Glenside, Pennsylvania that played in the American Soccer League (ASL).

They were named after, and claimed the heritage of, the original Philadelphia Atoms that played in the North American Soccer League from 1973 to 1976, and won the league championship in their first season.

In March 2017 the Philadelphia Atoms were given a second life when the newer squad was admitted into the ASL. The Atoms played for the first time in forty-years on April 1, 2017 versus Mass United FC. They currently play at Jean Lenox Stadium on the campus of Arcadia University. 

On September 23, 2017, the Philadelphia set an all-time record for goals scored in a single match by defeating the Lancaster Lions 6:1, breaking the five-goal record set by the Atoms on May 4, 1974 vs the Washington Diplomats in the NASL.

In 2018, the team dissolved due to insufficient support from ownership. Subsequently, the ASL dissolved as well.

Year-by-year

Head coaches
  George Gunn (Spring 2017)
  Ken Enofe (Fall 2017)
  Stewart Plenderleith (2018)

Team
2017 Roster

See also
 Philadelphia Fury
 Philadelphia Spartans
 Philadelphia Union

References

External links
Philadelphia Atoms

Association football clubs established in 2017
Soccer clubs in Pennsylvania
2017 establishments in Pennsylvania
American Soccer League (2014–2017) teams